Shannon Whirry is an American actress.

Career
A native from Green Lake, Wisconsin, where she was the salutatorian of her 1983 high school graduating class, in 1985 Whirry was accepted to study at the American Academy of Dramatic Arts, one of only 365 accepted out of 3,000 applicants and one of only 65 to graduate the 2-year program. While attempting to establish her career in New York, Whirry worked as a bartender, took a number of small bit roles and appeared in a commercial for FedEx; the latter work finally allowed her to join the Screen Actors Guild. Her first film role was in the action film Out for Justice starring Steven Seagal.

She thereafter began to work in a number of direct-to-video erotic B-movies and unrated  thrillers, concurrent with Tanya Roberts, Maria Ford, and Shannon Tweed who appeared in the same kinds of films at the time. She starred in Gregory Hippolyte's productions of Animal Instincts I and II, Body of Influence, and Mirror Images II. Entertainment Weekly referred to Whirry and Hippolyte as "the Dietrich and Von Sternberg of the soft-core set" Other films at the time included Private Obsession and Playback, a Playboy production.

In the late-1990s, she transitioned from erotic thrillers into a series of roles on mainstream network television and films, including action, sci-fi and horror genres. She had a recurring role as Mike Hammer's secretary Velda in the television series Mike Hammer, Private Eye and made guest appearances on such shows as ER, Felicity, Seinfeld, V.I.P., Murphy Brown, Malcolm in the Middle and Nash Bridges. She also had a small role in the Jim Carrey film Me, Myself & Irene (2000).

In 2007, she appeared on a BBC TV miniseries, Nuclear Secrets, playing Kitty Oppenheimer, the wife of Robert Oppenheimer.

She occasionally performs with theater companies in Arizona, where she lives and has continued appearing in small roles in films, including independent film Raising Buchanan in 2019.

Filmography

Film

Television

References

External links

Living people
People from Green Lake, Wisconsin
American film actresses
American stage actresses
American television actresses
American Academy of Dramatic Arts alumni
Actresses from Wisconsin
20th-century American actresses
21st-century American actresses
Year of birth missing (living people)